"The Logical Song" is a song by English rock group Supertramp that was released as the lead single from their album Breakfast in America in March 1979. It was written primarily by the band's Roger Hodgson, who based the lyrics on his experiences being sent away to boarding school for ten years. The song became Supertramp's biggest hit, rising to  7 in the United Kingdom and No. 6 on the US Billboard Hot 100 chart. In 2001, a cover version by the band Scooter returned the song to the top 10 in several European countries.

Background
"The Logical Song" was written primarily by Roger Hodgson, the lyrics based on his experience of being sent away to boarding school for ten years. It was a very personal song for Hodgson; he had worked on the song during soundchecks, and completed the lyrics and arrangement six months before proposing it to the band for the album. In 1980, Hodgson was honoured with the Ivor Novello Award from The British Academy of Composers and Songwriters for "The Logical Song" being named the best song both musically and lyrically. "The Logical Song" also has the distinction of being one of the most quoted lyrics in schools.
 
Hodgson has said of the song's meaning: "'The Logical Song' was born from my questions about what really matters in life. Throughout childhood we are taught all these ways to be and yet we are rarely told anything about our true self. We are taught how to function outwardly, but not guided to who we are inwardly. We go from the innocence and wonder of childhood to the confusion of adolescence that often ends in the cynicism and disillusionment of adulthood. In 'The Logical Song', the burning question that came down to its rawest place was 'please tell me who I am', and that's basically what the song is about. I think this eternal question continues to hit such a deep chord in people around the world and why it stays so meaningful."

The lyrics have been said to be a condemnation of an education system focused on categorical jargon as opposed to knowledge and sensitivity. Billboard writer David Farrell described the song's theme as a "man lost in the world."  Ultimate Classic Rock critic Nick DeRiso described the theme as "the loss of childhood idealism."

According to the 1979 album notes, Supertramp co-founder Rick Davies wrote the vocal harmony on the second chorus, though Hodgson alone is credited with songwriting.

Composition

The song is written in the key of C minor and is set in time signature of common time (although the verses follow a 10-beat pattern of 4/4 - 2/4 - 4/4) with a tempo of 120 beats per minute. Roger Hodgson's vocal range spans two octaves, from G3 to E♭5. The song makes use of keyboards, castanets, and an instrumental section. Among the contemporary sound effects in this song are the 'tackled' sound from a Mattel electronic football game – popular at the time this song was released.

Reception
Rolling Stone called the song a "small masterpiece", praising the "hot sax" and Hodgson's "wry humor". The magazine also made comparisons between Hodgson and Ray Davies from the Kinks. Paul McCartney named "The Logical Song" as his favourite song of the year. Billboard considered it to be possibly Supertramp's best song to date with "solid and incisive lyrics" and a catchy hook.  Cash Box said that "a skillful and probing lyric and a raucous sax line are joined by a familiar circling guitar lick and excellent singing" and also praised the "emphatic" beat. Record World said that it "should hit the AORs first with Top 40 likely to follow."

The song was a hit on its original release, reaching No. 7 in the United Kingdom and No. 6 in the United States. The song achieved the most success in Canada where it spent two weeks at No. 1 on the Canadian RPM Singles Chart, was the top song of the year, and was certified Platinum in Canada. It stayed for three months on the Billboard Hot 100 in the middle of 1979.

Personnel
Roger Hodgson – lead and backing vocals, Wurlitzer electronic piano, electric and 12-string acoustic guitars
Rick Davies – Elka and Oberheim synthesisers, acoustic piano, Hammond organ, Hohner Clavinet with wah-wah, backing vocal
John Helliwell – alto saxophone, siren whistle, backing vocal, intro breathing
Bob Siebenberg – drums, castanets, timbales, cowbell, woodblocks
Dougie Thomson – bass

Charts and certifications

Weekly charts

Year-end charts

Sales and certifications

Scooter version

"Ramp! (The Logical Song)" (or just "The Logical Song" in certain territories) is a 2001 single by the German techno band Scooter, featured on their second singles compilation album Push the Beat for This Jam (The Singles 98–02). This version heavily samples Supertramp's recording, and makes lyrical references to British stadium house band the KLF.

The single reached No. 1 in Norway and Ireland, as well as in Australia in October 2002. It reached No. 2 in the United Kingdom, becoming Scooter's highest-charting single there; it has been certified gold by the British Phonographic Industry (BPI), selling over 400,000 copies, and was the UK's 15th-best-selling single of 2002.

The Scooter version was an anthem in Glasgow's rave culture throughout the 2000s.

Charts

Weekly charts

Year-end charts

Certifications

Release history

Legacy and other versions
"The Logical Song" has been covered by Brad Mehldau and At Vance. The Hee Bee Gee Bees made a parody of this song for "The Scatological Song" and The Barron Knights made a parody entitled "The Topical Song". There was also a second remake by the German "Hands Up" band Rave Allstars in 2007. It has also appeared in TV shows such as The Simpsons ("I Married Marge"), History Rocks and the closing scene of The United States of Taras series finale, as well as in the soundtrack of the film Magnolia.

The song was covered in 2013 with a change to the primary drum rhythm by synthpunk band Mindless Self Indulgence.

The song has also been reworded and used as a chant by supporters of Australian football club Western Sydney Wanderers, as well as by fans of Scottish Premiership side Celtic in tribute to midfielder Scott Sinclair.

References

External links
 

Songs about school
1979 singles
Songs written by Roger Hodgson
Supertramp songs
Music videos directed by Bruce Gowers
2001 singles
2002 singles
Number-one singles in Australia
RPM Top Singles number-one singles
Irish Singles Chart number-one singles
Number-one singles in Norway
UK Independent Singles Chart number-one singles
Scooter (band) songs
A&M Records singles
1979 songs
Rock ballads

hu:Ramp! (The Logical Song)
sk:Ramp! (The Logical Song)